is a city located in Shiga Prefecture, Japan. , the city had an estimated population of 113,229 in 45771 households and a population density of 290 persons per km².

Geography
Higashiōmi is located in east-central Shiga Prefecture, with a small shoreline the eastern shore of Lake Biwa, and extending inland to the Suzuka Mountains and the border with Mie Prefecture. Parts of the city are within the borders of the Suzuka Quasi-National Park.

Neighboring municipalities
Shiga Prefecture
Ōmihachiman
Hikone
Kōka
Ryūō
Hino
Aishō
Taga
Mie Prefecture
Inabe
Komono

Climate
Higashiōmi has a Humid subtropical climate (Köppen Cfa) characterized by warm summers and cool winters with light to no snowfall.  The average annual temperature in Higashiōmi is 12.7 °C. The average annual rainfall is 1673 mm with September as the wettest month. The temperatures are highest on average in August, at around 24.5 °C, and lowest in January, at around 1.1 °C. The highest recorded temperature was 38.8 ° C (July 26, 2014) and the lowest was -11.6 ° C (January 31, 1982).

Demographics
Per Japanese census data, the population of Higashiōmi has recently plateaued after several decades of growth.

History 
Higashiōmi is part of ancient  Ōmi Province. Portions of the area were under the control of Yamakami Domain, a 13,000 koku fudai territory during the Edo period Tokugawa shogunate. With the creation of the modern municipalities system on April 1, 1889, the town of Yōkaichi was established within Gamō District, Shiga. Yōkaichi merged with the villages of Hirata, Ichinobe, and Tamano in Gamō District, and Misono and Takebe from Kanzaki District and was elevated to city status on August 15, 1954. The city of Higashiōmi was established on February 11, 2005, from the merger of Yōkaichi with the towns of Eigenji and Gokashō (both from Kanzaki District), and the towns of Aitō and Kotō (both from Echi District).

On January 1, 2006, the town of Notogawa (from Kanzaki District), and the town of Gamō (from Gamō District) were merged into Higashiōmi.

Government
Higashiōmi has a mayor-council form of government with a directly elected mayor and a unicameral city council of 25 members. Higashiōmi, together with the town of Ryūō, contributes three members to the Shiga Prefectural Assembly. In terms of national politics, the city is part of Shiga 2nd district and Shiga 4th district of the lower house of the Diet of Japan.

Economy
The economy of Higashiōmi is centered on agriculture and light manufacturing. There are several industrial parks in the city. Murata Manufacturing, Kyocera, Panasonic, Suntory and Toppan have large factories in the city.

Education
Higashiōmi has 22 public elementary schools and ten public middle schools operated by the city government. There are five public high schools operated by the Shiga Prefectural Department of Education. The prefecture also operates one special education school for the handicapped.  The Biwako-Gakuin University, a private's university with associated junior college, is also located in Higashiōmi.

Transportation

Railway
 JR West – Biwako Line
 
 Ohmi Railway – Main Line
  -   -  -  -  -  -  -  -  
 Ohmi Railway –  Yōkaichi Line
  -  -  -  -

Highway
  Meishin Expressway

Local attractions 
Eigen-ji, noted Rinzai Zen temple
Hyakusai-ji, noted Tendai temple, National Historic Site
 Yōkaichi Kite Festival

Sister cities and cultural exchange cities
Higashiōmi maintains the following sister city relationships.
  Changde, Hunan, China (since August 15, 1994)
   Jangam-myeon, Chungcheongnam-do, South Korea (since November 2, 1992)
   Marquette, Michigan, USA (since August 13, 1979; renewed 2005)
  Rättvik, Dalarna County, Sweden (since November 1, 1994)
   Taber, Alberta, Canada (since March 27, 1981)
   Tongyeong, Gyeongsangnam-do, South Korea (since May 26, 2001)

Noted people from Higashiōmi 
Masayoshi Takemura, politician
Tadayoshi Ichida, politician
Mitsunori Okamoto, politician

References

External links 

  
 Tourist Association website 
 Giant Kite Festival in HigashiomiNHK(video)

Cities in Shiga Prefecture
Higashiōmi